Detroit Falcons can refer to:

 Detroit Falcons (NHL), former name (used from 1930 to 1932) for the Detroit Red Wings of the National Hockey League
 Detroit Falcons (basketball), defunct team in the Basketball Association of America (1946–1947)
 Detroit Falcons (CoHL), defunct team in the Colonial Hockey League (1991–1996)